Enrica Merlo (born 28 December 1988 in Este) is an Italian female volleyball player, playing as a libero. She has played for the Italy women's national volleyball team, notably being part of the 2009 Women's European Volleyball Championship winning team. On club level she plays for Savino Del Bene Scandicci.

Career
She has won various titles, including the Italian Serie A1, Italian Cup, Italian Super Cup and twice the CEV Women's Champions League. She was selected to play the Italian League All-Star game in 2017.

Clubs
  Megius Volley Padova (2004–2006)
  Pallavolo Reggio Emilia (2006–2007)
  Foppapedretti Bergamo (2007–2015)
  Savino Del Bene Scandicci (2015–present)

Awards

Individuals
 2006 Women's Junior European Volleyball Championship "Best Libero"
 2008–09 CEV Champions League "Best Libero"
 2009–10 CEV Champions League "Best Libero"
 2017-18 Italian League "All-Star"

National team

Junior
 2006 Women's Junior European Volleyball Championship –  Gold medal
 2009 Universiade –  Gold medal

Senior
 2009 European Championship –  Gold medal
 2010 FIVB World Grand Prix –  Bronze medal

Clubs
 2007–08 Italian Championship –  Bronze medal, with Foppapedretti Bergamo)
 2007–08 Italian Cup –  Gold medal, with Foppapedretti Bergamo
 2008 Italian Super Cup –  Silver medal, with Foppapedretti Bergamo
 2008–09 Italian Championship –  Bronze medal, with Foppapedretti Bergamo
 2008–09 CEV Women's Champions League –  Gold medal, with Foppapedretti Bergamo
 2009–10 Italian Championship –  Bronze medal, with Foppapedretti Bergamo
 2009–10 CEV Women's Champions League –  Gold medal, with Foppapedretti Bergamo
 2010 FIVB Volleyball Women's Club World Championship –  Bronze medal, with Foppapedretti Bergamo
 2010–11 Italian Championship –  Gold medal, with Foppapedretti Bergamo
 2011 Italian Super Cup –  Gold medal, with Foppapedretti Bergamo
 2013–14 Italian Cup –  Silver medal, with Foppapedretti Bergamo

References

External links

 Profile at CEV
 Profile  at Italian Women's Volleyball League

1988 births
Living people
Italian women's volleyball players
Sportspeople from the Province of Padua
Universiade medalists in volleyball
Universiade gold medalists for Italy
Medalists at the 2009 Summer Universiade